Duane Michals ( "Michaels"; born February 18, 1932) is an American photographer. Michals's work makes innovative use of photo-sequences, often incorporating text to examine emotion and philosophy.

Education and career 
Michals's interest in art began at age 14 while attending watercolor university classes at the Carnegie Institute in Pittsburgh. In 1953, he received a B.A. from the University of Denver. In 1956, after two years in the Army, he went on to study at the Parsons School of Design with a plan to become a graphic designer; however, he did not complete his studies.

He describes his photographic skills as "completely self-taught." In 1958, while on a holiday in the USSR he discovered an interest in photography. The photographs he made during this trip became his first exhibition held in 1963 at the Underground Gallery in New York City.

For a number of years, Michals was a commercial photographer, working for Esquire and Mademoiselle, and he covered the filming of The Great Gatsby for Vogue (1974). He did not have a studio. Instead, he took portraits of people in their environment, which was a contrast to the method of other photographers at the time, such as Avedon and Irving Penn.

Michals was hired by the government of Mexico to photograph the 1968 Summer Olympics. In 1970, his works were shown at the Museum of Modern Art in New York. The portraits he took between 1958 and 1988 would later become the basis of his book, Album.

In 1976, Michals received a grant from the National Endowment for the Arts. Michals also produced the art for the album Synchronicity (by The Police) in 1983, and Clouds Over Eden by Richard Barone in 1993.

Artistic influences and impact 

Though he has not been involved in gay civil rights, his photography has addressed gay themes. In discussing his notion of the artist's relationship to politics and power however, Michals feels ultimately that aspirations are useless:I feel the political aspirations are impotent. They can never be seen. If they are, it will only be by a limited audience. If one is to act politically, one simply puts down the camera and goes out and does something. I think of someone like Heartfield who ridiculed the Nazis. Who very creatively took great stands. He could have been killed at any moment, he was Jewish, and my God what the guy did. It was extraordinary. You don't see that now. Michals cites Balthus, William Blake, Lewis Carroll, Thomas Eakins, René Magritte, and Walt Whitman as influences on his art.  In turn, he has influenced photographers such as David Levinthal and Francesca Woodman.

He is noted for two innovations in artistic photography developed in the 1960s and 1970s.  First, he "[told] a story through a series of photos" as in his 1970 book Sequences.  Second, he handwrote text near his photographs, thereby giving information that the image itself could not convey.

Personal life 
Michals grew up in McKeesport, Pennsylvania, and currently lives in New York City. He was raised Catholic.

Michals' partner Frederick Gorrée died in 2017. The two were together since 1960.

Publications

Exhibitions

Solo exhibitions 

 1970: Museum of Modern Art, New York City
 1971: George Eastman House, Rochester, NY
 1976: Wadsworth Atheneum, Hartford, CT
 2005: International Center of Photography, New York City
 2008: Museum of Photography, Thessaloniki, Greece
 2014: Carnegie Museum of Art, Pittsburgh, PA
 2015: Peabody Essex Museum, Salem, MA
 2018: Duane Michals: The Portraitist, Crocker Art Museum, Sacramento, CA

Group exhibitions 
 1966: Toward a Social Landscape, George Eastman House, Rochester, NY. Photographs by Michals, Bruce Davidson, Lee Friedlander, Danny Lyon, and Garry Winogrand. Curated by Nathan Lyons.
 1999: Cosmos, Musée de Beaux-Arts de Montréal
 1999: The Century of the Body: Photoworks 1900–2000, Musée de l'Élysée, Lausanne
 1999: From Camouflage to Free Style, Musée d'Art Moderne de la Ville de Paris
 2004: The Ecstasy of Things, Fotomuseum Winterthur, Switzerland

Awards 
 1991: Honorary Fellowship, The Royal Photographic Society
 1994: Gold medal for photography, National Arts Club
 2000: Masters Series Award, School of Visual Arts
 2020: Induction into the International Photography Hall of Fame and Museum

Further reading

Books

Film and video 
  (DVD, 14 minutes, New York Film Festival, 1979, B&W/color)
  (Video, 29 minutes, B&W/color)
  (Full-length documentary)

References

External links 
DC Moore Gallery, Artist's page.
Weinberg, Jonathan. "Things are queer."  Originally published in Art Journal, December 22, 1996.
Vettese, John. Duane Michals. Temple University page, 2001.
Svede, Mark Allen. Michals, Duane (b. 1932). glbtq: An Encyclopedia of Gay, Lesbian, Bisexual, Transgender, and Queer Culture, February 7, 2004.
2004 Hall of fame: Duane Michals. New York: Art Directors Club, 2004.
BOMB Magazine interview with Duane Michals by David Seidner (Summer, 1987).
Showing the things we cannot see, an interview with Duane Michals

1932 births
Living people
People from McKeesport, Pennsylvania
20th-century American photographers
21st-century American photographers
American people of Slovak descent
Fine art photographers
American gay artists
American LGBT photographers
Parsons School of Design alumni
American portrait photographers
University of Denver alumni
21st-century American LGBT people